Good Manager is a South Korean television drama starring Namkoong Min, Nam Sang-mi, Lee Jun-ho, and Jung Hye-sung. It aired on KBS2 from January 25 to March 30, 2017 on Wednesdays and Thursdays at 22:00 (KST) for 20 episodes.

Synopsis 
Kim Sung-ryong, a Certified Public Accountant who becomes a middle manager at TQ Group company to embezzle a large sum of money ends up fighting for his employees' fundamental rights.

Cast

Main 
 Namkoong Min as Kim Sung-ryong (Jiro Kim)
Kim Sung-ryong used to be a small-time accountant from Gunsan, a small city in North Jeolla Province, working for a mobster. He was investigated every year for accounting fraud and tax evasion but is proven innocent every time. Then, he got accepted to TQ as the chief of Accounting Department.
 Nam Sang-mi as Yoon Ha-Kyung (Hannah Yoon)
A strong and ethical woman. She is the assistant manager of TQ's Accounting Department.
 Lee Jun-ho as Seo Yul
Seo Yul used to be an ace prosecutor until the chairman of the TQ group appointed him to be the Director for Finance.
 Jung Hye-sung as Hong Ga-eun (Gail Hong)
Police officer in undercover as intern of the Finance department who was hired as a spy by a prosecutor.

Supporting

TQ Group Business Operation Department 

 Kim Won-hae as Choo Nam-ho
 Kim Kang-hyun as Lee Jae-joon
 Jo Hyun-sik as Won Ki-ok
 Ryu Hye-rin as Bing Hee-jin
 Seo Ye-hwa as Je-ri
 Kim Seon-ho as Sun Sang-tae

People at TQ Group 

 Park Yeong-gyu as Park Hyun-do (Dino Park)
 Lee Il-hwa as Jang Yoo-sun
 Seo Jeong-yeon as Jo Min-young
 Jung Suk-yong as Ko Man-geun
 Kim Min-sang as Lee Kang-shik
 Hwang Young-hee as Uhm Keum-shim
 Kim Jae-hwa as Na Hee-yong
 Dong Ha as Park Myung-suk (Mario Park)

People at Seoul Central District Prosecutors 

 Jung Moon-sung as Han Dong-hoon
 Nam Sung-joon  as Lee Suk-soo

People at Gunsan 
 Lim Hwa-young as Oh Kwang-suk

Extended 

 Lee Sung-uk
 Park Kwang-jae
 Jeon Ye-seo
 Nam Sang-baek
 Choi Kyu-shik
 Choi Jae-sub
 Eom Ji-man
 Jo Jae-won
 Heo Sun-haeng
 Lee Yoon-sang

Special appearances 

 Kim Eung-soo as Bae Deok-po
 Lee Sang-hoon
 Song Yeong-gil
 Jung Kyung-ho as man blackmailing Kim Sung-ryong
 Lee Si-eon as Prosecutor Park Yong-tae (Ep. 20)

Production 
 First script reading took place on December 15, 2016 at KBS Annex Broadcasting Station in Yeouido, Seoul, South Korea.

Original soundtrack

Part 1

Part 2

Part 3

Part 4

Part 5

Part 6

Part 7

Part 8

Reception
Despite competing against big-budget drama Saimdang, Light's Diary in the same time slot and having no big-name stars, the drama managed to top ratings during its run and enjoyed explosive popularity. It received positive reviews for its punchy and satirical lines on the corrupt corporate owners and the society, which resonated with the viewers; and the multifaceted performance of lead actor Namkoong Min, whose perfect amalgamation of character creation and acting saves “Good Manager” from what could have been an average office crime comedy. Korea Times said that the drama "has the ability to tell uncomfortable stories (story of embezzlement cases, mass layoffs and other societal issues regarding fierce competition) in a witty way".

Ratings
In this table,  represent the lowest ratings and  represent the highest ratings.

Awards and nominations

Adaptation 
It was announced on March 24, 2017 that KBS Media will publish a book titled "Chief Kim's Work Book" set to be released in April related to the drama that will contain great tips for work life. The book will feature the drama's best scenes, best lines, and all of the illustrated episode endings. The illustrations will be drawn by webtoon artist Yang Kyung-soo, who partnered with the drama to create the ending scenes for each episode. This project is the first collaboration between a drama and a webtoon.

References

External links 
  
 
 
 

Korean Broadcasting System television dramas
2017 South Korean television series debuts
2017 South Korean television series endings
South Korean comedy-drama television series
Television series produced in Seoul
Television series by Logos Film
South Korean workplace television series